The 2021–22 Alps Hockey League was the sixth season of the Alps Hockey League. The defending champions were Slovenian team HK Olimpija that participate in ICE Hockey League beginning from the 2021–22 season.

Teams
The number of participating teams has risen to seventeen from the previous season: Vienna Capitals Silver, reserve team of the Vienna Capitals (which in the previous season had decided not to participate due to the uncertainty caused by the COVID-19 pandemic) and the EK Zeller Eisbären (which was instead excluded due to the resignation of the board of directors of the company); HC Merano requested and obtained from the Italian Ice Sports Federation a wild-card that allowed him to enroll in the AHL and return to play the Italian top flight after seventeen years; the reigning champions HK Olimpija and HC Pustertal Wölfe from South Tyrol have instead moved to the ICE Hockey League.

Notes

Format 
The formula has changed again: the seventeen teams will meet in a regular season, for a total of 32 games each. At the end of the regular season, the first six team will classify to the master round, the rest will be divided into the two qualification groups (the teams finished 7th, 10th, 11th, 14th, 15th will be placed in Group A, the others in Group B), also played in two rounds.

The first four teams  at the end of the master round qualify directly to the play-offs. The remaining two teams in the master round and the top three in each qualification round group will instead have access to the preliminary round to determine the other four teams.

Changes to the regulation due to the COVID-19 pandemic 
At the end of December 2021, when it became clear that the number of matches postponed for reasons related to the COVID-19 pandemic had become too high for all recoveries to be organized in time for the expected end of the regular season, the league decided that to determine the ranking not by the number of points earned, but the average of the points, calculated as the quotient between the points and the number of games played. In order to be considered classified, a team was still required to play at least 70% of the scheduled matches.

National championships

Italian championship 

The Italian teams participating in the AHL will also play for the Italian title. As in the 2018–19 season, all the matches between Italian teams during the regular season form a ranking, and at the end first four teams will play in the semifinals and the final.

Second division of the Austrian championship 
Similarly to what happens for the Italian championship, the meetings between the Austrian teams in the regular season of the Alps Hockey League determine a ranking, at the end of which the first four teams will play for the second series title with semifinals and final with first legs and return.

The qualified teams are Lustenau, Kitzbühel, Bregenzerwald and Red Bull Salzburg Jr.

Regular season

Second stage

Master Round 
The first six teams at the end of the regular season qualified for the Master Round, with the first four classified being given the bonus from 4 to 1 point. At the end of the master round, the first four teams qualify directly to the quarter-finals of the play-offs, the other qualify to the preliminary round.

Qualification Group A 
Teams finished 7th, 10th, 11th, 14th and 15th in the regular season are qualified for Qualification Group A, with the first three receiving bonus equal to 6, 3 and 2 points respectively. At the end of the qualifying round, the top three teams advance to the preliminary round.

Qualification Group B 
Teams finished 8th, 9th, 12th, 13th, 16th and 17th in the regular season are qualified for Qualification Group B, with the first three receiving bonus equal to 5, 4 and 1 point respectively. At the end of the qualifying round, the top three teams advance to the preliminary round.

Play-offs

Bracket

Pre-playoffs

Quarterfinals

Semifinals

Finals

Final rankings

References

External links 

Alps Hockey League seasons
2021–22 in European ice hockey leagues
2021–22 in Italian ice hockey
2021–22 in Austrian ice hockey
2021–22 in Slovenian ice hockey